Spink Arms Hotel, also known as the Lionel Artis Center, is a historic hotel building located at Indianapolis, Indiana.  It was built in 1919, and consists of two eight-story, brick towers linked by a one-story connector.  It is in the Tudor Revival style and features twin four-story oriel windows on each tower and a crenellated parapet.  Behind the building is a four-story parking garage constructed in 1922.

It was listed on the National Register of Historic Places in 2001.

References

External links

Hotel buildings on the National Register of Historic Places in Indiana
Tudor Revival architecture in Indiana
Hotel buildings completed in 1919
Hotels in Indianapolis
National Register of Historic Places in Indianapolis